Henry Lewis (December 14, 1844 – March 29, 1930) was a soldier in the Union Army and a Medal of Honor recipient for his actions in the American Civil War.

Medal of Honor citation
Rank and organization: Corporal, Company B, 47th Ohio Infantry. Place and date: At Vicksburg, Miss., May 3, 1863. Entered service at: Adrian, Mich. Born: December 14, 1842, Van Buren Township, Wayne County, Mich. Date of issue: April 17, 1917. 

Citation:

Was one of a party that volunteered and attempted to run the enemy's batteries with a steam tug and two barges loaded with subsistence stores.

See also

List of American Civil War Medal of Honor recipients: G–L

References

 

1844 births
1930 deaths
People from Belleville, Michigan
United States Army Medal of Honor recipients
Union Army soldiers
People of Michigan in the American Civil War
American Civil War recipients of the Medal of Honor